Trebania flavifrontalis is a species of snout moth. It is found in Korea, Japan and China.

The wingspan is 33–35 mm. The ground colour of the wings is dark grayish brown. Adults are on wing in July.

References

Moths described in 1889
Pyralini
Moths of Japan